This is a list in alphabetical order of cricketers who have played for Ace Capital Cricket Club in first-class matches. It includes those who played for the club in its earlier incarnations as Seeduwa Raddoluwa Cricket Club (until 2011) and Sri Lanka Ports Authority Cricket Club (until 2020). Where there is an article, the link comes before the club career span, and the scorecard name (typically initials and surname) comes after. If no article is present, the scorecard name comes before the span.

A
 A. L. K. L. Abeyrathne (2021–22)
 M. S. I. K. Abeysekara (2020–21)
 Adeel Malik (2017–18) : Adeel Malik
 P. Adithya (2022)
 H. S. H. Alles (2009–10)
 P. S. Anil (2022–23)
 W. M. N. A. Aponso (2011–12)
 U. K. D. Aravinda (2010–11)
 M. Aravinda (2019–20)
 B. M. D. T. D. Ariyasinghe (2010–11)
 B. Y. Arumathanthri (2011–12)
 N. H. Atharagalla (2022 to 2022–23)

B
 Chaminda Bandara (2012–13 to 2019–20) : K. M. C. Bandara
 M. A. T. S. Bandara (2014–15)
 G. M. P. S. Bandara (2022)
 T. S. Baskaran (2022 to 2022–23)
 Andri Berenger (2008–09) : A. R. Berenger

C
 K. G. B. Chandrabose (2022–23)
 E. W. Y. Chanuka (2009–10)
 Yohan Chanuka (2015–16 to 2019–20) : L. G. Y. Chanuka
 S. M. Colombage (2022–23)
 Nick Compton (2017–18) : N. R. D. Compton
 N. H. G. Cooray (2021–22 to 2022–23)
 D. L. S. Croospulle (2022 to 2022–23)

D
 P. A. D. Dabare (2021–22 to 2022)
 P. T. M. Dabare (2021–22 to 2022–23)
 Anuk de Alwis (2011–12 to 2018–19) : A. A. S. de Alwis
 V. S. R. de Mel (2012–13)
 Yohan de Silva (2013–15) :  A. Y. R. de Silva
 D. M. de Silva (2014–15)
 J. D. M. de Silva (2008–09 to 2009–12)
 Chirantha de Silva (2008–09) : K. M. P. C. de Silva
 Yohan de Silva (2012–13 to 2019–21) : K. Y. de Silva
 Lakshitha de Silva (2009–10 to 2010–11) : M. R. L. de Silva
 S. J. C. de Silva (2009–10)
 Malinga de Silva (2017–18) : U. N. M. de Silva
 Anjana de Silva (2019–20) : Y. A. de Silva
 Ranil Dhammika (2008–09 to 2010–11) : D. G. R. Dhammika
 T. N. Dharmapriya (2021–22)
 H. M. S. N. Dharshana (2008–09)
 N. A. D. M. M. Dias (2008–09)
 B. A. D. A. Dilhara (2022 to 2022–23)
 S. A. D. Dilpriya (2019–20)
 W. K. G. Dilruk (2008–09 to 2009–10)
 G. P. S. Disanayaka (2021–22 to 2022–23)
 Shanuka Dissanayake (2011–12 to 2016–17) : D. M. G. S. Dissanayake

E
 E. M. C. D. Edirisinghe (2016–17)
 G. S. M. Ekanayake (2014–15 to 2015–16)
 G. D. R. Eranga (2010–12)

F
 B. O. P. Fernando (2022 to 2022–23)
 E. F. M. U. Fernando (2010–11)
 K. A. D. M. Fernando (2011–12)
 K. G. D. Fernando (2008–09 to 2010–11)
 Mevan Fernando (2009–10 to 2010–11) : K. M. Fernando
 M. L. A. Fernando (2008–09)
 Sanjaya Fernando (2011–12) : M. S. D. Fernando
 S. E. C. Fernando (2009–10)
 S. I. Fernando (2011–12; 2022)
 U. L. K. D. Fernando (2010–11)
 W. W. C. S. Fernando (2010–11)

G
 B. G. Y. D. Gamaarachchi (2022)
 K. H. Gamage (2022)
 T. P. Gamage (2013–14)
 Akalanka Ganegama (2016–17 to 2017–18) : W. C. A. Ganegama
 M. T. Gunaratne (2011–12)
 R. Gunasekera (2018–19)
 Hashan Gunathilleke (2009–10 to 2010–17) : M. D. H. D. Gunathilleke

H
 Hasnain Bokhari (2019–20)
 B. U. D. Hettiarachchi (2020–21)
 P. C. Hettiwatte (2021–22 to 2022–23)
 Wanindu Hasaranga (2015–16) : P. W. Hasaranga

I
 K. Ishwara (2022–23)
 Navodya Imesh (2020–21) : E. M. N. Imesh

J
 M. M. Jaleel (2022–23)
 Charith Jayampathi (2008–09; 2017–18 to 2018–19) : W. M. C. Jayampathi
 D. H. Jayasinghe (2011–12)
 S. D. Jayathilake (2009–10)
 D. K. R. C. Jayatissa (2021–22 to 2022–23)
 R. A. C. G. Jayaweera (2011–12)
 H. G. K. D. Jayawickrama (2012–13)

K
 N. N. Kadam (2022–23)
 S. Kalavitigoda (2011–12 to 2013–14)
 K. R. M. D. Kaluarachchi (2011–12)
 M. S. Kamileen (2008–09)
 Y. C. Kankanamge (2021–22)
 M. L. R. Karunaratne (2010–11)
 T. M. U. S. Karunaratne (2008–09 to 2009–10; 2021–22)
 V. A. Kiriella (2019–20)
 Chanaka Komasaru (2011–12 to 2019–22) : N. C. Komasaru
 M. K. D. V. Kulatunga (2021–22)
 Geeth Kumara (2008–09 to 2009–10) : H. G. Kumara
 Mangala Kumara (2009–10) : K. M. P. Kumara
 W. S. Kumara (2022–23)
 A. U. Kumarasinghe (2008–09)

L
 M. D. N. Lakshan (2021–22)
 Lasith Lakshan (2015–16) : W. W. W. L. Lakshan
 Yashodha Lanka (2017–18) : A. K. K. Y. Lanka
 U. A. D. Lanka (2019–20)
 D. P. L. M. Liyanage (2009–10 to 2010–11)
 S. N. Liyanage (2022 to 2022–23)
 Maduka Liyanapathiranage (2017–18) : M. A. Liyanapathiranage

M
 Gayan Maneeshan (2012–13 to 2019–20) : W. W. A. G. Maneeshan
 I. Massalage (2008–09 to 2009–10)
 B. M. T. T. Mendis (2011–12 to 2013–14)
 Rashmika Mevan (2020–21) : R. P. R. Mevan
 Chathura Milan (2017–18 to 2018–19) : R. P. C. Milan
 Mohammad Irfan (Lahore) (2022–23)
 Mohammad Rizlan (2022–23)
 P. B. W. Munige (2012–13 to 2013–14)
 T. M. I. Mutaliph (2011–12)

N
 Adeesha Nanayakkara (2018–19 to 2019–21) : A. N. Nanayakkara
 A. V. S. Nikethana (2009–10 to 2010–11)
 Ramesh Nimantha (2017–18 to 2019–20) : V. W. R. Nimantha
 U. G. L. Nimsara (2015–16)
 W. G. Niroshan (2010–11)
 L. D. P. Nishantha (2010–11)
 D. N. A. D. S. D. Nissanka (2018–19)

O
 T. T. R. Opernayake (2022)

P
 P. P. Pallewela (2008–09)
 D. C. G. Perera (2008–09)
 D. K. K. V. Perera (2015–16)
 H. Perera (2021–22)
 K. P. A. Perera (2018–19)
 K. R. N. U. Perera (2011–12 to 2018–19)
 L. D. S. A. Perera (2009–10)
 M. M. D. P. V. Perera (2011–12)
 Ranesh Perera  (2013–14) : R. Perera
 W. A. D. A. S. Perera (2020–21)
 W. P. N. A. Perera (2020–21)
 Dilhara Polgampola (2019–21) : T. D. Polgampola
 J. Prakash (2021–22)
 Aravinda Premaratne (2014–15 to 2016–17) : S. D. P. A. Premaratne
 W. G. H. N. Premaratne (2020–21)
 B. A. R. S. Priyadarshana (2010–11)
 Nalin Priyadarshana (2017–18) : R. P. N. Priyadarshana
 S. M. A. Priyanjan (2012–13 to 2015–16)
 C. Priyantha (2014–15)
 J. G. N. Priyantha (2008–09)
 Manjula Priyantha (2008–09 to 2009–10) : P. M. Priyantha
 Sanka Purna (2020–21) : S. Purna
 M. Pushpakumara (2012–13)
 P. M. Pushpakumara (2014–15)
 P. G. C. S. P. Pussegolla (2020–21)

R
 Harsha Rajapaksha (2015–16) : H. M. Rajapaksha
 R. J. K. T. D. Ranatunga (2022 to 2022–23)
 H. G. P. Ranaweera (2010–11)
 W. G. C. D. Ranaweera (2010–11)
 Nisal Randika (2017–18) : K. G. N. Randika
 Ishan Rangana (2012–13 to 2019–2021) : W. A. I. Rangana
 S. Ridma (2021–22)
 Kavindu Ridmal (2019–2021) K. Ridmal
 Gihan Rupasinghe (2015–16 to 2018–19) : R. J. M. G. M. Rupasinghe

S
 Saeed bin Nasir (2019–20) : Saeed Bin Nasir
 I. S. S. Samarasooriya (2020–21 to 2021–22)
 S. K. Samaratunga (2019–20)
 W. B. H. Samarawickrame (2008–09 to 2009–10)
 S. C. Serasinghe (2013–14 to 2014–15)
 T. R. Sharma (2019–20)
 Shoaib Nasir (2017–18) : Shoaib Nasir
 M. K. Silva (2022)
 R. J. P. R. Silva (2018–19)
 Y. Silva (2014–15)
 I. C. Soysa (2010–11)

T
 W. W. P. Taraka (2008–09; 2015–16)
 Nisala Tharaka (2012–13) : N. Tharaka
 D. H. A. P. Tharanga (2014–15)
 M. B. C. D. Thilakarathne (2022 to 2022–23)
 D. Thissakuttige (2022 to 2022–23)
 Y. N. Tillakaratne (2010–11)
 P. S. I. P. Tissera (2010–11)
 H. Tissera (2013–14)
 Andawaththa Tyronne (2015–16) : A. K. Tyronne

U
 I. Udana (2012–13 to 2014–15)
 M. L. Udawatte (2013–14 to 2014–15)
 R. J. I. Udayanga (2018–19)
 Pasindu Ushettige (2019–21) : P. Ushettige

V
 J. D. F. Vandersay (2010–11)
 Hasindu Vidarshana (2018–19 to 2019–20) : H. J. Vidarshana
 Hashan Vimarshana (2015–16 to 2019–20) : W. A. H. Vimarshana

W
 K. M. S. P. Wannithilake (2020–21)
 M. S. Warnapura (2009–10)
 M. G. Wathugedera (2021–22)
 G. K. Weerasekera (2012–13 to 2014–15)
 Chalanaka Weerasinghe (2013–14 to 2018–19) : C. P. Weerasinghe
 D. R. F. Weerasinghe (2019–21)
 D. S. D. Weerasinghe (2019–20)
 W. M. D. T. Weerasinghe (2008–09)
 Prashan Wickramasinghe (2011–12 to 2019–21) : P. C. Wickramasinghe
 S. Wickrema (2013–14)
 Amoda Widanapathirana (2019–21) : M. A. Widanapathirana
 Omesh Wijesiriwardene (2012–13 to 2016–17) : O. L. A. Wijesiriwardene
 Rakitha Wimaladarma (2011–12) : W. R. D. Wimaladarma

References

Ace Capital Cricket Club